was a daimyō of Odawara Domain in Sagami Province (modern-day Kanagawa Prefecture) in early-Edo period Japan, until 1686 when he was transferred to Takada Domain in Echigo Province. Later he was transferred again, to Sakura Domain in Shimōsa Province.   His courtesy title was Mino no Kami.

Biography
Inaba Masamichi was the eldest son of the previous daimyō of Odawara, Inaba Masanori. Due to the influence of the Tairō Sakai Tadakiyo, he rose rapidly through the hierarchy of the Tokugawa shogunate. He was appointed concurrently as a Sōshaban (Master of Ceremonies) and Jisha-bugyō on April 9, 1681, and received another concurrent appointment as Kyoto Shoshidai on December 24 of the same year.

On the retirement of his father in 1683, he became head of the Inaba clan, and inherited his father’s position as daimyō of Odawara (102,000 koku).
His cousin, Inaba Masayasu, served as a wakadoshiyori in Edo.  Masayasu visited Kyoto as part of a formal inspection in 1683.

However, in 1685, Masamichi was ordered to resign his position as Kyoto Shoshidai and to transfer from Odawara to Takada Domain in Echigo Province (103,000 koku).

On January 11, 1701, Masamichi became a Rōjū under shōgun Tokugawa Tsunayoshi, and in June of that year was transferred to Sakura Domain in Shimōsa Province (103,000 koku).

On August 7, 1707, he retired from public life, turning his domain over to his son Inaba Masatomo. He died in 1716, and his grave is at the temple of Yōgen-ji in Bunkyō, Tokyo.

Notes

References
 Appert, Georges and H. Kinoshita. (1888).  Ancien Japon. Tokyo: Imprimerie Kokubunsha.
 Meyer, Eva-Maria. (1999). Japans Kaiserhof in de Edo-Zeit: Unter besonderer Berücksichtigung der Jahre 1846 bis 1867. Münster: Tagenbuch. 
 Papinot, Edmond. (1906) Dictionnaire d'histoire et de géographie du japon. Tokyo: Librarie Sansaisha...Click link for digitized 1906 Nobiliaire du japon (2003)
 Sasaki, Suguru. (2002). Boshin sensō: haisha no Meiji ishin. Tokyo: Chūōkōron-shinsha.
 Tucker, John Allen. (1998). Itō Jinsai's "Gomō Jigi" and the Philosophical Definition of Early Modern Japan. Leiden: Brill Publishers. 

|-

|-

|-

Rōjū
Fudai daimyo
Kyoto Shoshidai
1640 births
1716 deaths
Inaba clan